Aladia Airlines, S.A. de C.V. was a Mexican low-cost chartered airline based in Monterrey, Nuevo León. Commercial operations were commenced in December 2006 using four Boeing 757-200 aircraft on several domestic and international routes.

Due to the Financial crisis of 2007–2008, Aladia Airlines suspended all operations on 21 October 2008.

In 2011, ALADIA group removed Pablo González-Ulloa from his position of chairman of the board of directors and all other positions in the company. They also initiated legal action against him, holding him responsible for mismanagement of the company during his administration. The airline was not officially dissolved, though, and a relaunch may be possible, according to Aladia officials, its license remains valid.

Destinations
As of October 2008, Aladia Airlines served the following destinations:

Mexico
Cancún  (focus city)
Chihuahua
Cozumel
Guadalajara
Mazatlán
Mexico City
Monterrey
Puerto Vallarta
Puebla
Toluca

United States
Colorado
Vail
Florida
Orlando
Nevada
Las Vegas

Other Countries
Aruba
Brazil
Costa Rica
Cuba
Guatemala

Fleet
The Aladia Airlines fleet consists of the following aircraft (as of August 2010):

External links
Official website

References

Defunct airlines of Mexico
Airlines established in 2006
Airlines disestablished in 2008